The BYU Cougars men's golf team represents the Brigham Young University in the sport of golf. The Cougars compete in Division I of the National Collegiate Athletic Association (NCAA) and the West Coast Conference. They play their home matches on the Riverside Country Club Golf Course, and are currently led by head coach Bruce Brockbank. The Cougars men's golf program has won 25 conference championships: 21 Western Athletic Conference, two Mountain West Conference, and two West Coast Conference. In 1981, they won the NCAA Division I Championship.

Individual honors

All-Americans

 Mike Taylor – 1966 (HM)
 Johnny Miller – 1966 (HM), 1967 (1st)
 Lane Bennett – 1969 (HM)
 Ray Leach – 1969 (3rd)
 Chip Garriss – 1970 (HM)
 Ray Leach – 1970 (2nd), 1971 (1st), 1972 (2nd)
 Dave Shipley – 1971 (3rd)
 Joey Dills – 1972 (HM), 1973 (HM), 1974 (HM)
 Mike Reid – 1973 (HM), 1974 (1st), 1975 (1st), 1976 (2nd)
 Lance Suzuki – 1973 (1st)
 Jimmy Blair – 1974 (HM), 1976 (HM)
 Mike Brannan – 1975 (3rd), 1976 (1st), 1977 (3rd), 1978 (3rd)
 John Fought – 1976 (3rd)
 Jim Nelford – 1976 (2nd), 1977 (2nd)
 Jamie Edman – 1977 (HM)
 Pat McGowan – 1977 (2nd)
 Stan Souza – 1978 (HM)
 Bobby Clampett – 1978 (1st), 1979 (1st), 1980 (1st)
 Dave DeSantis – 1979 (HM)
 Richard Zokol – 1980 (HM), 1981 (2nd)
 Tom Costello – 1980 (HM)
 Barry Willardson – 1980 (3rd), 1981 (3rd),  1982 (3rd)
 Keith Clearwater – 1981 (1st), 1982 (2nd)
 Rick Fehr – 1982 (1st), 1983 (2nd), 1984 (1st)
 Keith Goyan – 1983 (HM)
 Robert Meyer – 1983 (3rd), 1984 (2nd)
 Eduardo Herrera – 1984 (HM), 1986 (2nd), 1987 (2nd)
 Rick Gibson – 1984 (3rd)
 Brent Franklin – 1985 (HM), 1986 (1st), 1987 (2nd)
 Steve Schneiter – 1987 (HM)
 Bruce Brockbank – 1988 (3rd)
 Ramon Brobio – 1990 (HM)
 Mike Weir – 1992 (2nd)
 Eric S. Rustand – 1994 (HM)
 Todd Pence – 1995 (HM)
 Andy Miller – 1997 (3rd), 1998 (2nd), 1999 (2nd), 2000 (2nd)
 Bill Harvey – 1999 (HM)
 Jose Garrido – 1999 (HM)
 Manuel Merizalde – 2000 (HM), 2001 (3rd)
 Jake Ellison – 2004 (HM)
 Todd Miller – 2004 (HM)
 Óscar David Álvarez  – 2004 (HM), 2005 (2nd)
 Daniel Summerhays – 2006 (HM), 2007 (1st)
 Jake Ellison – 2006 (HM)
 Robbie Fillmore – 2010 (HM)
 Zac Blair – 2012 (3rd)
 Patrick Fishburn – 2018 (3rd)
 Rhett Rasmussen – 2019 (HM)
 Peter Kuest – 2019 (2nd)
 Carson Lundell – 2021 (HM)

Note: 1st = first team, 2nd = second team, 3rd = third team, HM = honorable mention
Source:

Haskins Award
 Bobby Clampett — 1979, 1980

Other notable alumni
Buddy Allin
Brad Sutterfield
Mitch Voges
Dean Wilson

References

External links

 
Sports clubs established in 1961
1961 establishments in Utah